Dudley Edward Roberts (born 16 October 1945 in Derby) is an English retired footballer who played in The Football League for four clubs in the 1960s and 1970s. He was a tall centre-forward who is probably best remembered from his six-year spell at Mansfield Town.

Roberts, the son of former Coventry City striker Ted Roberts, began his career at his father's old club, signing a professional contract in November 1963. However, despite a good goalscoring record, he only played a handful of games for the Sky Blues, and moved to Mansfield Town in March 1968, making his debut against Brighton & Hove Albion.

Roberts' greatest moment of fame came on 26 February 1969, when Roberts scored the first goal in Mansfield's shock 3–0 win against West Ham United in the fifth round of the FA Cup. The following year, he had a goal disallowed when Mansfield lost 2–0 against Leeds United, also in the fifth round of the FA Cup. He also had a goal disallowed in the goalless draw against Liverpool the same year in the League Cup, denying Mansfield a famous victory.

In league competition, Roberts was Mansfield's top scorer in 1969–70 and 1970–71. He scored four goals in Mansfield's 6–2 win against Tranmere Rovers on 27 February 1971, and also scored a hat-trick on two other occasions.

Roberts left Mansfield in the February 1974, having scored 73 goals in 230 games for the club. He subsequently joined Scunthorpe United. He also had a short loan spell at Doncaster Rovers in early 1973. He retired from the game in 1976 due to injury, and settled in the Mansfield area.

References

1945 births
Living people
English footballers
Coventry City F.C. players
Mansfield Town F.C. players
Doncaster Rovers F.C. players
Scunthorpe United F.C. players
Footballers from Derby
Association football forwards